Egerton Football Club is a football club based in Knutsford, Cheshire, England.

History
Egerton were formed in 2002 and was named after Maurice Egerton. In the 2017–18 season, Egerton received national media attention after the signings of former Football League players Jlloyd Samuel, Nathan Ellington and Dean Gorré. In the same season, Egerton finished fourth in the Cheshire League One, being promoted to the Premier Division in the process. Egerton entered the FA Vase for the first time in 2019–20. The club were later withdrawn from the FA Vase after failing a ground grading inspection.

Ground
The club play at Egerton Youth Club in Knutsford. In May 2016, chairman Tom O'Donnell announced plans to redevelop the site in order to be eligible for promotion to the North West Counties League.

References

External links
Official website

Egerton family
Association football clubs established in 2002
2002 establishments in England
Football clubs in England
Football clubs in Cheshire
Sport in the Borough of Cheshire East
Knutsford
Cheshire Association Football League